Craig McGrath (born 2 April 1974) is a New Zealand rugby union coach and former player. He is currently an assistant coach with the Melbourne Rebels, and coach of the Melbourne Rising. His usual playing positions was Scrum-half.

He attended High School at Waitākere College.

Coaching
McGrath worked as coach of Waitemata Rugby and Boyne RFC before becoming the coach of Melbourne Harlequins in 2014. He joined the Rebels as assistant coach in 2015, before being appointed coach of Melbourne Rising from the 2018 season.

References

External links

Harlequin Rugby Profile

1974 births
Living people
Auckland rugby union players
Māori All Blacks players
North Harbour rugby union players
Blues (Super Rugby) players
Rugby Viadana players
New Zealand expatriate rugby union players
New Zealand rugby union coaches
Expatriate rugby union players in Italy
New Zealand expatriate sportspeople in Italy